Hani Kobeissy is a Shia Lebanese member of parliament who was elected in 2009 to represent the Shiite seat in the Beirut II district. He is part of the Amal Movement.

See also
 Lebanese Parliament
 Members of the 2009-2013 Lebanese Parliament
 Amal Movement

References

Living people
Members of the Parliament of Lebanon
Lebanese Shia Muslims
Amal Movement politicians
Year of birth missing (living people)